MLD may refer to:


Medicine
 Manual lymphatic drainage
 Metachromatic leukodystrophy, a rare neurometabolic genetic condition

Science and technology

 Mean log deviation in statistics and econometrics
 Mixed layer depth in hydrography
 Multicast Listener Discovery, in computer networking
 Million liter per day, in environmental engineering

Other

 ICAO airline designator of Air Moldova
 Maldives, ITU country code
 Maniac Latin Disciples, a street gang
 Marine Luchtvaart Dienst, the Dutch Naval Aviation Service
 Mutually locally derivable, a mathematical property of aperiodic tile sets
 EU Money Laundering Directive
 Miluo East railway station, China Railway pinyin code MLD
Monolingual learner's dictionary, type of dictionary designed to meet the reference needs of people learning a foreign language.